Bethanie Mattek-Sands and Sania Mirza were the defending champions, but they decided not to participate.

Alla Kudryavtseva and Anastasia Rodionova won the title, defeating Kristina Mladenovic and Galina Voskoboeva in the final, 6–3, 6–1.

Seeds

Draw

References 
 Main draw

Brisbane International - Women's Doubles
Women's Doubles